The Farnese Hercules is an ancient statue of Hercules, probably an enlarged copy made in the early third century AD and signed by Glykon, who is otherwise unknown; the name is Greek but he may have worked in Rome. Like many other Ancient Roman sculptures it is a copy or version of a much older Greek original that was well known, in this case a bronze by Lysippos (or one of his circle) that would have been made in the fourth century BC. This original survived for over 1500 years until it was melted down by Crusaders in 1205 during the Sack of Constantinople. The enlarged copy was made for the Baths of Caracalla in Rome (dedicated in 216 AD), where the statue was recovered in 1546, and is now in the Museo Archeologico Nazionale in Naples. The heroically-scaled Hercules is one of the most famous sculptures of antiquity, and has fixed the image of the mythic hero in the European imagination.

The Farnese Hercules is a massive marble statue, following a lost original that was cast in bronze through a method called lost wax casting. It depicts a muscular, yet weary, Hercules leaning on his club, which has the skin of the Nemean lion draped over it. In myths about Heracles, killing the lion was his first task. He has just performed one of the last of The Twelve Labours, which is suggested by the apples of the Hesperides he holds behind his back.

The type was well known in antiquity, and among many other versions a Hellenistic or Roman bronze reduction, found at Foligno is in the Musée du Louvre. A small Roman marble copy can be seen over the Museum of the Ancient Agora, Athens (see illustration).

Description 
Hercules is depicted in a moment of rest. Leaning on his gnarled club, which is draped in the skin of the Nemean lion, he holds the golden apples stolen from the Hesperides, hiding them behind his back, in his right hand.

History 
The rediscovered statue quickly made its way into the collection of Cardinal Alessandro Farnese, grandson of Pope Paul III. Alessandro Farnese was well placed to form one of the greatest collections of classical sculpture that had been assembled since antiquity. It stood for generations in its own room at Palazzo Farnese, Rome, where the statue was surrounded by frescoed depictions of the hero's mythical feats that were created by Annibale Carracci and his studio, executed in the 1590s. The Farnese statue was moved to Naples in 1787 with most of the Farnese Collection and is now displayed in the Museo Archeologico Nazionale there.

The sculpture has been reassembled and restored by degrees. According to a letter of Guglielmo della Porta, the head had been recovered separately, from a well in Trastevere, and was bought for Farnese through the agency of della Porta, whose legs made to complete the figure were so well-regarded that when the original legs were recovered from ongoing excavations in the Baths of Caracalla, della Porta's were retained, on Michelangelo's advice, in part to demonstrate that modern sculptors could bear direct comparison with the ancients. The original legs, from the Borghese collection, were not reunited with the sculpture until 1787. Goethe, in his Italian Journey, recounts his differing impressions upon seeing the Hercules with each set of legs, however, marvelling at the clear superiority of the original ones.

Hercules is caught in a rare moment of repose. Leaning on his knobby club which is draped with the pelt of the Nemean lion, he holds the apples of the Hesperides, but conceals them behind his back cradled in his right hand. Many engravings and woodcuts spread the fame of the Farnese's Hercules. By 1562 the find was already included in the set of engravings for Speculum Romanae Magnificentiae ("Mirror of Rome's Magnificence") and connoisseurs, artists, and tourists gaped at the original, which stood in the courtyard of the Palazzo Farnese, protected under the arcade. In 1590–91, during his trip to Rome, Hendrik Goltzius sketched the statue in the palazzo courtyard. Later (in 1591) Goltzius recorded the less-common rear view, in a bravura engraving (illustration, right), which emphasizes the already exaggerated muscular form with swelling and tapering lines that flow over the contours. The young Rubens made quick sketches of the planes and massing of the statue of Hercules. Before photography, prints were the only way to put the image into many hands.

The sculpture was admired from the start, reservations about its exaggerated musculature only surfacing in the later eighteenth century. Napoleon remarked to Antonio Canova that its omission from the museum he accumulated in Paris was the most important gap in the collection. More than once, the sculpture was crated and made ready for shipment to Paris before the Napoleonic regime fled Naples.

List of other ancient copies 

The prominently sited statue was well liked by the Ancient Romans, and copies have been found in Roman palaces and gymnasiums: another, coarser copy stood in the courtyard of Palazzo Farnese; one with the feigned (but probably ancient) inscription "Lykippos" has stood in the court of Palazzo Pitti, Florence, since the sixteenth century. Ancient copies of the statue include:
 Hercules, 2nd century AD, Roman copy, Uffizi Gallery, Florence.
 The “Weary Herakles” is a heavily broken Roman marble statue that was excavated in 1980 in Perge, Turkey. The looted upper torso was sold to the Museum of Fine Arts, Boston, in 1981. The upper torso was returned to Turkey in 2011 and is now displayed with the rest of the piece at the Antalya Museum.
 Colossal statue of Hercules, uncovered at the baths in Hippo Regius (Annaba), Algeria.
 Resting Herakles, Hermitage, Saint Petersburg.
 Badly damaged late Hellenistic Parian marble headless statue, recovered from the Antikythera Shipwreck in 1901 Athens, National Archaeological Museum.
 Headless statue at Izmit Archaeology and Ethnography Museum.
 Broken headless torso found in the bathhouse Roman & Byzantine village in the Jezreel valley.
 Broken headless torso from the Amphiareion of Oropos, Athens, National Archaeological Museum.
 Broken headless torso of 2nd or 3rd century AD, in Museum of Saint-Raymond in Toulouse.
 Statuette of 2nd century AD, in Detroit Institute of Arts.
 Bronze statuette with silver-inlaid eyes of 40–70 AD, Getty Villa.

Later copies 
After rediscovery of the Farnese Hercules, copies appeared in sixteenth and eighteenth-century gardens throughout Europe. During construction of the Alameda de Hercules (1574) in Seville, the oldest public garden preserved in Europe, at its entrance were installed two columns from a Roman temple, elements of a building still preserved in the Mármoles, an unquestionable sign of admiration for the Roman archaeological sites. On them were placed two sculptures by Diego de Pesquera, in 1574, recognizing Hercules as founder of the city, and Julius Caesar, restorer of Híspalis. The first was a copy of the Farnese Hercules, nearly the monumental size of the original. At Wilhelmshöhe, near Kassel, a colossal version 8.5 m high produced by Johann Jacob Anthoni, 1713–1717, has become a symbol for the city.

André Le Nôtre placed a full-size gilded version against the skyline at the far end of the main vista at Vaux-le-Vicomte. At the Palace of Versailles is a copy by Jean Cornu (1684–86). In Scotland a rare copy in lead, from the first half of the eighteenth century, is sited incongruously in the central Highlands, overlooking the recently restored Hercules Garden in the grounds of Blair Castle. Wealthy collectors were able to afford any one of numerous bronze replicas, created in various sizes for table-top display.

The statue is shown in the 1954 film Journey to Italy along with the Farnese Bull.

A replica, titled Herakles in Ithaca, was erected in 1989 on the campus of Cornell University in Ithaca, NY. The statue was a gift from its sculptor, Jason Seley, a professor of fine arts. Seley created the sculpture in 1981 out of chrome automobile bumpers.

The statue has inspired artists such as Jeff Koons and Matthew Darbyshire to create their own versions in plaster and polystyrene, respectively. Their use of white materials to re-create the sculpture has been interpreted by classicist Aimee Hinds as a perpetuation of colourism in classical art.

A copy of the sculpture is among the ten statues adorning the front yard of the Schlossgarten in Karlsruhe, Germany.

References

Notes

Bibliography 
 
 
  Catalogue no. 46.

External links 

 Goltzius' engraving at the Metropolitan Museum of Art

Archaeological discoveries in Italy
Collections of the National Archaeological Museum, Naples
Farnese Collection
Roman copies of 4th-century BC Greek sculptures
Sculptures of Heracles
Marble sculptures in Italy